Gop Jam railway station  is a railway station serving in Jamnagar district of Gujarat State of India. It is under Bhavnagar railway division of Western Railway Zone of Indian Railways. Passenger, Express trains halt here. To reach Gop mountain, Zinavari's old Sun temple and Gopnath mahadev temple etc. tourist attractions, this railway station is very near and useful.

Trains 

The following major halt at Gop Jam railway station in both directions:

 19015/16 Porbandar - Mumbai Central Saurashtra Express

References

Railway stations in Jamnagar district
Bhavnagar railway division